Saganaga Lake is a large lake on the Minnesota – Ontario international border.  Most of the lake is protected by the Boundary Waters Canoe Area Wilderness in the United States and by Quetico Provincial Park and La Verendrye Provincial Park in Canada. A small part of the lake's southern arm is outside the Boundary Waters. Its name comes from an Ojibwe term meaning Lake of Many Islands.

Saganaga is a popular fishing destination, with northern pike, walleye, lake trout, smallmouth bass, and lake whitefish among others.  Minnesota Department of Natural Resources has issued a consumption advisory for some fish in Saganaga Lake due to mercury pollution. The Lake is the eastern boundary of the historical Hunter Island region. Saganaga Lake is bordered to the south by Seagull Lake, home to Wilderness Canoe Base.

References

External links
 Map of Saganaga Lake

Protected areas of Cook County, Minnesota
Lakes of Rainy River District
Lakes of Thunder Bay District
Lakes of Minnesota
Canada–United States border
International lakes of North America
Glacial lakes of Canada
Glacial lakes of the United States
Superior National Forest
Lakes of Cook County, Minnesota